James Peter Trakas (born May 5, 1965) is an American politician who served as a member of the Ohio House of Representatives from 1999 to 2006. He was the Republican nominee for the United States House of Representatives in Ohio's 10th congressional district in 2008.

Education 
Trakas earned a Bachelor of Arts degree from Ohio State University in social and behavioral sciences.

Career 
In 1991, Trakas was elected to the Independence City Council where he served two terms. In 1996 Trakas was elected chairman of The Republican Party of Cuyahoga County, serving until 2005.

In 1998, Trakas was elected to the Ohio House of Representatives representing the 15th district, later renumbered the 17th district, where he served until 2007. As State Representative Trakas served two terms as House Majority Whip, and was a member of the Finance and Appropriations Committee. During Trakas' tenure, he authored 14 bills into law, including the Third Frontier Program. In 2002, Trakas was named "Best Politician" by Cleveland Scene, an alternative newspaper.

Jim Trakas was the Republican nominee for the United States House of Representatives in Ohio's 10th congressional district, unsuccessfully challenging incumbent Democrat Dennis Kucinich. Trakas left office in 2006. In 2018, he was a candidate for the 6th district of the Ohio House of Representatives, losing narrowly to Democratic nominee Phil Robinson.

See also
United States House of Representatives elections in Ohio, 2008

References

External links
Jim Trakas' campaign site

1965 births
Living people
People from Cleveland
Republican Party members of the Ohio House of Representatives
People from Cuyahoga County, Ohio